Stanley Dunham is the name of:

Stanley Armour Dunham (1918–1992), grandfather of Barack Obama
Stanley Ann Dunham (1942–1995), mother of Barack Obama